A bachelor pad is a home (pad) in which a bachelor or bachelors (single men) live. The exact standards on what constitutes a bachelor pad are often ambiguous and debated but one definition describes it as: 
"A 'bachelor pad' is a slang term for a living space owned by a bachelor (single man) that is designed as a collective space (as opposed to individual items) with the purpose of facilitating a bachelor in his daily activities to include but not limited to daily functionality, use of free time, hobbies and interests, entertaining friends, and seducing women. A bachelor pad can be done on a very limited budget as is the case with many young adults and college students or to a level of extravagance as seen amongst celebrities."
It should not be confused with the formal term "bachelor apartment", which is used in real estate to refer to an apartment with no bedrooms, in which the main room serves as a bedroom, living room and dining room (and sometimes kitchen).

History
In the United Kingdom the term bachelor pad usually refers to a flat where a single young man lives alone. Most students in the UK are unable to afford this luxury, and are forced to live with other students, hence the heightened social status attributed to this particular sense of the phrase.

In the United States it generally refers to small houses or apartments where unmarried men, often college/university students, live until they obtain larger or more luxurious houses or apartments, are married, or generally "move up" in standards of living and taste. It also became a symbol of independence and freedom for young people when leaving their parent's house for the first time.

During the 1950s and 1960s, the bachelor pad was considered one of the ultimate possessions for a young career-minded man. In this space, he was able to decorate his apartment with style to fit his tastes. For much of the early 20th century, the female presence in the home dominated while it was a man's responsibility to become the breadwinner. In the 1950s, men's attitudes about marriage changed with the representation and openness of sexuality featured on-screen. At this point, the thought of  being single was welcomed, and most men felt comfortable to court a number of women freely. The bachelor pad then became a symbol of the 1960s cosmopolitan male, and a typical "pad" included: a bar, an array of artwork, furniture (usually designed by a well-known architect), minimal décor, and a hi-fi system for entertaining. It reflected his awareness of culture and the arts, while at the same time it acted as a lure for potential female visitors — which meant it was usually clean.  Fictional examples can be seen in films such as Rock Hudson's pad in Pillow Talk, Brian Bedfords in The Pad and How to Use It, James Bond's residence in any of the early James Bond films, and Tony Stark's Malibu Mansion.

Later bachelor pads are stereotyped as being messy, with old food and dirty dishes and clothing being strewn about the floor, sinks, and other areas in proximity to places where they are useful (examples being dirty clothes piled up near a washer and/or dryer, dirty dishes in a sink, or moldy food in a refrigerator) — often to the disgust of women related to or involved with the men living in "pads." Several men may share a pad and its expenses for financial reasons or friendship, which stereotypically worsens living conditions compared to the one person case, as depicted in The Odd Couple and its derivatives. Pads may also be the sites of wild parties.

In the late 1990s, bachelor pads became unique spaces and habitat of so many odd youngsters as shown in pictures by photographer Michael Rababy. 

Unmarried men's living accommodations are often detailed in fiction in a way in which women's flats are not. Examples from the range of fiction include: the home of Withnail and his flatmate in the film Withnail and I.  A less dire pad was depicted in the 1966 film The Pad and How to Use It. Finally, the famous shared rooms of Sherlock Holmes and Dr. Watson were a combination dining room, interview room, laboratory and library.

See also 
 Bedsit
 Man cave
 Pied-à-terre
 Studio apartment
 Alfie
 Shaun of the Dead
 Wedding Crashers

References

 Osgerby, Bill. :"The Bachelor Pad as Cultural Icon: Masculinity, Consumption, and Interior Design in American Mens Magazines 1930-1965." In Journal of Design History, Vol. 18, No. 1, Publishing the Modern Home: Magazines and the Domestic Interior 1870-1965 (2005), pp. 99–113.

External links 
 

Housing
English-language slang
Men's quarters